Something from Tiffany's is a 2022 American Christmas romantic comedy film directed by Daryl Wein, from a screenplay by Tamara Chestna. It is based on the novel of the same name by Melissa Hill. The film stars Zoey Deutch, Kendrick Sampson, Ray Nicholson, and Shay Mitchell.

Something from Tiffany's was released on December 9, 2022, by Amazon Studios via Prime Video.

Plot
After her boyfriend Gary is hit by a car outside a Tiffany's store, Rachel wrongfully assumes he wants to marry after finding a ring box in his belongings. Unbeknownst to her, the box got mixed up with the one of the men who performed first aid on him, Ethan.

Out of gratitude for saving her boyfriend, Rachel invites Ethan to her bakery, where the two bond. At Christmas, when both open their respective box, the mix-up is discovered by Ethan, who remains silent because his girlfriend Vanessa likes the earrings Gary bought. Gary on the other hand, who is amnesiac from the accident, thinks he actually bought the ring and makes a proposal. The next day, Ethan tries to meet Gary to retrieve the ring, so he can finally propose. Stuck with Rachel because Gary is stuck at work, the two spend another evening together. 

The day after, Gary refuses to return the ring, however; when Rachel goes to the store to get cleaning tips, she finds out that the ring was actually bought by Ethan. Gary reveals that he immediately knew the ring wasn’t his, but realized he wanted to marry her, so he went through with the proposal. Questioned by Rachel, he says he still wants to marry her. Rachel meets Ethan at her bakery and tells him Gary will return the ring to him, after which he can finally make his proposal.

At New Year's Eve, it is revealed that Gary actually met Rachel because he was on his way to a hook-up, causing her to break up with him. When Ethan and Vanessa simultaneously arrive, the latter realizes that Ethan lied to her for days, angrily storming off. During their argument, they realize they have different plans for the future, and also decide to break up.

Ethan and Rachel meet and kiss, starting a relationship. A year later at Christmas Eve, Ethan proposes to her with the ring she accidentally received a year earlier.

Cast
 Zoey Deutch as Rachel Meyer
 Kendrick Sampson as Ethan Greene
 Ray Nicholson as Gary Wilson
 Shay Mitchell as Vanessa
 Leah Jeffries as Daisy Greene
 Jojo T. Gibbs as Terri Blake
 Javicia Leslie as Sophia
 Chido Nwokocha as Brian Harrison
 Stephanie Shepherd as Tiffany Saleswoman
 Michael Roark as David

Production
On October 30, 2021, it was reported that Zoey Deutch would star in and be an executive producer on Something from Tiffany's, based on the novel of the same name by Melissa Hill. The film will be produced by Reese Witherspoon and Lauren Neustadter for Hello Sunshine, as a co-production with Amazon Studios. It will be Hello Sunshine's first film, and was adapted for the screen by Tamara Chestna.

In December 2021, it was reported that Kendrick Sampson, Ray Nicholson, Shay Mitchell, and Leah Jeffries had joined the cast. In February 2022, it was reported that Jojo T. Gibbs, Javicia Leslie, Chido Nwokocha, Stephanie Shepherd, and Michael Roark had been added to the cast.

Filming commenced in New York City in December 2021.

Release
The film was released on Prime Video on December 9, 2022.

Critical response 
 On Metacritic, the film has a weighted average score of 46 out of 100, based on 10 critics, indicating "mixed or average reviews".

References

External links 
 

2022 romantic comedy films
2020s American films
2020s Christmas comedy films
2020s English-language films
Amazon Prime Video original films
Amazon Studios films
American Christmas comedy films
American romantic comedy films
Films based on American novels
Films based on romance novels
Films set in New York City
Films shot in New York City